KJAV (104.9 FM, "Ultra 104.9") is a radio station licensed to serve Alamo, Texas, United States. The station is owned by Bi-Media, LLC, through licensee Bi-Media Licensee, LLC. The principals of Bi-Media are the Bichara family, which also owns the Núcleo Radio Monterrey cluster in Monterrey, Mexico.

On January 18, 2016, KJAV dropped the Jack FM branding and rebranded as Ultra 104.9.

History
This station received its original construction permit from the Federal Communications Commission on October 9, 1979.  The new station was assigned the KJAV call sign by the FCC on January 14, 1980.  KJAV received its license to cover from the FCC on October 23, 1980.

In August 1986, license holder Lonnie M. Horton reached an agreement to sell this station to Paulino Bernal. The deal was approved by the FCC on October 10, 1986, and the transaction was consummated on May 4, 1987.

In October 2004, La Radio Cristiana Network Inc. (Paulino Bernal Jr., president) reached an agreement to sell this station to BMP Radio through their BMP RGV License Company, LP, subsidiary holding company for a reported $7 million.  The deal was approved by the FCC on December 14, 2004, and the transaction was consummated on January 16, 2005.  At the time of the sale, KJAV broadcast a Spanish-language Christian radio format.

After BMP Radio bought the station in 2005, they changed the Spanish format of the station. Later it became a rhythmic oldies format, branded as "Jammin 104.9 The Valley's Old School". The station had a morning show on weekdays with Tony Fornia and then played music with no disc jockeys afterward. In August 2007, the station announced that it would soon change formats accompanied by the R.E.M. song "It's the End of the World as We Know It (And I Feel Fine)" every time it went to commercials. In mid-September 2007, the station flipped the format to Jack FM. In 2009 Jack FM began broadcasting the games of the Rio Grande Valley Vipers of the NBA Development League.

On February 17, 2011, KJAV changed its call letters to KRIO-FM. This change proved short-lived as on March 3, 2011, KRIO-FM changed its call letters back to KJAV.

BMP sold the station and five sister stations to Roberto González's MBM Texas Valley LLC for a purchase price of $2.5 million; the transaction was consummated on March 14, 2013.

On November 6, 2015, KJAV and sister station KVJY were sold to Bi-Media, LLC, which is controlled by members of the Bichara family. The transaction was consummated on December 31, 2015, at a purchase price of $2.2 million.

References

External links

JAV
Radio stations established in 1980
Hidalgo County, Texas
1980 establishments in Texas